Dying of the Light may refer to:

Literature
 A phrase from the poem "Do not go gentle into that good night" by Dylan Thomas
 Dying of the Light (novel), a 1977 novel by George R. R. Martin
 The Dying of the Light (novel), a 1993 novel by Michael Dibdin

Other media
 Dying of the Light (film), a 2014 American psychological thriller
 "Dying of the Light" (Heroes), a 2008 television episode
 The Dying of the Light (Warhammer Fantasy Roleplay), a 1995 role-playing game adventure
 "The Dying of the Light", a 2015 song by Noel Gallagher's High Flying Birds from Chasing Yesterday

See also
 Against the Dying of the Light, a 2001 documentary film
 Skulduggery Pleasant: The Dying of the Light, a 2014 young adult novel by Derek Landy